Valgesoo  is a village in Põlva Parish, Põlva County in southeastern Estonia.

It is close to Valgesoo bog, which is classified as a Landscape Protection Area.

References

 

Villages in Põlva County